Male dominance, or maledom, refers to BDSM activities where the dominant partner is male.

Practices of domination common to many BDSM and other various sexual relationships are also prevalent, such as various forms of body worship, cock and ball worship, ass worship, fellatio, foot worship; tease and denial; corporal punishment including spanking, breast torture, caning, whipping; orgasm denial; and as well as verbal humiliation, face slapping, hair pulling, dripping hot wax on the genitals, spitting, golden showers, "forced" chastity, and irrumatio.

A 1995 study indicated that 71% of heterosexual males preferred a dominant-initiator role, but a more recent study from 2015 indicates that only 29.5% of men who are active in BDSM express a preference for a dominant role, 24% consider themselves to be switches and 46.6% of men prefer the submissive role.

Popular culture

Maledom scenarios are common in BDSM fiction, including works such as the Story of O and the works of John Norman and Adrian Hunter. Maledom is a growing adult film genre.

Maledom fiction began with the works of the Marquis de Sade who wrote about sexual scenarios in which men tortured others, primarily women. The term sadism is derived from de Sade's name. Since then, the lifestyle around male dominance has grown into a large part of the BDSM scene.

The Fifty Shades novel series by E. L. James are some of the most widely read BDSM-themed novels of our time.

Other works include:
John Warren, The Loving Dominant, Greenery Press, 2001, 
Jack Rinella, The Master's Manual: Handbook of Erotic Dominance, Daedalus Publishing, 1997,

See also
Dominance and submission
Female dominance
Female submission
Gender role
Genital torture
Male submission

References

External links 

Male Domination on Wipipedia, a specialist BDSM wiki

BDSM terminology
Men